The canton of Surgères is an administrative division of the Charente-Maritime department, western France. Its borders were modified at the French canton reorganisation which came into effect in March 2015. Its seat is in Surgères.

It consists of the following communes:

Aigrefeuille-d'Aunis
Ardillières
Ballon
Breuil-la-Réorte
Chambon
Ciré-d'Aunis
Forges
Landrais
Marsais
Puyravault
Saint-Georges-du-Bois
Saint-Mard
Saint-Pierre-d'Amilly
Saint-Pierre-la-Noue
Saint-Saturnin-du-Bois
Surgères
Le Thou
Virson
Vouhé

References

Cantons of Charente-Maritime